is an interchange railway station located in Midori-ku, Yokohama, Kanagawa Prefecture, Japan, jointly operated by the East Japan Railway Company (JR East) and the Yokohama Municipal Subway.

Lines
Many services continue west of Higashi-Kanagawa via the Negishi Line to  during the offpeak, and to  during the morning peak.

Station layout
JR East station has a single side platform and an island platform serving three tracks. It has a Midori no Madoguchi staffed ticket office. The Yokohama Green Line subway station has a single island platform serving two underground tracks.

JR East platforms

Yokohama Municipal Subway platforms

History
Nakayama Station opened on 23 September 1908. A new station building was completed in 1985. With the privatization of JNR on 1 April 1987, the station came under the operational control of JR East. It became an interchange station with the Green Line on 30 March 2008.

Station numbering was introduced to the Yokohama Line on 20 August 2016 with Nakayama being assigned station number JH19.

Accidents
On 20 January 2006, a 60-year-old man was killed by a train at the station after jumping from the platform onto the tracks to commit suicide.

On 1 October 2013, a 40-year-old woman, was hit and killed by a train while trying to assist a 74-year-old-man who was spotted lying on the level crossing immediately to the east of the station. The man survived with injuries.

Passenger statistics
In fiscal 2019, the JR station was used by an average of 41,986 passengers daily (boarding passengers only). During the same period, the Yokohama Municipal Subway by an average of 15,383 passengers daily, (boarding passengers only).

The daily average passenger figures (boarding passengers only) for previous years are as shown below.

Surrounding area
 Midori Ward Office
 Yokohama College of Commerce Midori Campus
 Yokohama Zoological Gardens ("Zoorasia")

References

External links

 Nakayama Station (JR East)  
 Nakayama Station (Green Line) 

Railway stations in Kanagawa Prefecture
Railway stations in Japan opened in 1908
Railway stations in Yokohama
Yokohama Line